The North Pine River is a minor river located in South East Queensland, Australia.

Location and features

The river flows mostly through the Moreton Bay Region, just to the south of Dayboro. Along with Kobble Creek it is dammed at Whiteside to form the North Pine Dam, an artificial lake called Lake Samsonvale. This catchment provides drinking water to Redcliffe, Pine Rivers, Caboolture and the northern suburbs of Brisbane.

After the North Pine Dam, the North Pine River continues through the suburbs of Petrie and Lawnton, where it meets with the South Pine River and forms the Pine River, flowing into Bramble Bay. The river descends  over its  course.

The former Pine Rivers Shire draws its name from the North Pine, South Pine and Pine Rivers.

History
In the early 1930s timber for the construction of the Hornibrook Bridge was brought down the North Pine River to Bramble Bay via barge. Lake Kurwongbah was built in 1964 on Sideling Creek, a tributary of the North Pine River.

In January 2011, a significant flood occurred due to heavy rain and dam releases from North Pine Dam. Some areas of Petrie, Strathpine, Lawnton and surrounding areas had to be evacuated on short notice as the river level rose quickly causing flooding in low lying areas.

Flora and fauna
The North Pine River is one of a few rivers that contains natural populations of the rare Queensland lungfish. Platypus sightings in both the North and South Pine rivers are relatively common compared to other rivers in the region.

Cat's claw creeper (Dolichandra unguis-cati) is an invasive weed vine that has done much damage to trees along the North Pine River catchment. In Queensland Cat's Claw is a Category 3 declared weed, which means its release into the environment is not allowed without a special permit.

See also

References

External links

 Moreton Bay Waterways Management
SEQWater's North Pine Dam

Rivers of Queensland
Shire of Pine Rivers
South East Queensland